Wiadomości was a Polish cultural weekly magazine published in London between 1946 and 1981. The journal was the continuity title of the pre-World War II weekly, published in Warsaw (1924–1939) and subsequently of the "Wiadomości Polskie, Polityczne i Literackie", published during the War (1940–1944) in Paris and London.

History 

The paper's founders in London were Mieczysław Grydzewski and Antoni Borman. Grydzewski was a seasoned publicist having already begun as the editor of the monthly literary review Skamander in 1920s Poland, before founding and editing Wiadomości Literackie in 1924. The modest circulation of 15,000, appealed mainly to the Polish intelligentsia and belied its profound cultural impact on the newly resurrected nation state. Its early contributors were heavily drawn from the Skamander literary group which numbered in its ranks people such as Julian Tuwim, Antoni Słonimski, Kazimierz Wierzyński, Jan Lechoń, Jarosław Iwaszkiewicz, Józef Wittlin, Stanisław Baliński, Zuzanna Ginczanka. Others included Tadeusz Boy-Żeleński, Emil Breiter, Michał Choromański, Karol Irzykowski, Irena Krzywicka, Jerzy Liebert, Stanisław Ossowski, Maria Pawlikowska-Jasnorzewska, Ksawery Pruszyński, Jozef Retinger, Zbigniew Uniłowski, Michał Walicki, Bruno Winawer and Stefania Zahorska. In 1933 Bruno Schulz made his debut in its columns. Illustrations and cartoons were by Zdzisław Czermański, Władysław Daszewski and Jerzy Zaruba among others. 

At the outbreak of war in September 1939, Grydzewski fled Poland and arrived in France. After the capitulation of France he moved to the United Kingdom, where he remained for the rest of his life. In Paris Grydzewski resumed his publishing activity with Wiadomości Polskie, Polityczne i Literackie ('Polish News, Political and Literary'). Wiadomości Polskie continued in London. In September 1941 its distribution was restricted by the Polish government-in-exile in that Polish Armed Forces were forbidden to receive it on account of its published criticism of the Sikorski–Mayski agreement. It was effectively closed down by the British authorities when its paper allowance was discontinued in February 1944, possibly at the request of the Polish authorities.

New beginnings 

In 1946, Grydzewski resumed publication of his weekly monochrome broadsheet format on glossy paper, under the title Wiadomości. The editors-in-chief were: Mieczysław Grydzewski, (officially until his death in 1970, in practice until 1966, when he was partially paralysed after a stroke), Michał Chmielowiec until 1974, and Stefania Kossowska until 1981. No longer incommoded by war time restrictions it followed in the tradition of its pre-war precursor Wiadomości Literackie. Among its regular contributors were some old hands, Stanisław Baliński, Ferdynand Goetel, Marian Hemar, Jerzy Stempowski, Marian Kukiel, Jan Lechoń, Wacław Lednicki, Józef Łobodowski, Rafał Malczewski, Józef Mackiewicz, Zygmunt Nowakowski, Adam Pragier, Jan Rostworowski, Stanisław Stroński, Tymon Terlecki, Wiktor Weintraub, Ignacy Wieniewski, Kazimierz Wierzyński and Józef Wittlin.

Polish book prize
In 1958 an English Polonophile, Auberon Herbert, sponsored an annual "Wiadomości Prize" for the best rated newly published émigré book (not necessarily a novel). Prize-winners began with Marek Hłasko, followed by archaeology professor Tadeusz Sulimirski, Witold Gombrowicz, Leopold Tyrmand, Czesław Miłosz and Włodzimierz Odojewski among others.

Later the weekly published work by contemporary poets, who had emerged since the Second World War, including, Stanisław Barańczak, Adam Zagajewski, Florian Śmieja, Bogdan Czaykowski, Adam Czerniawski and Andrzej Aleksander Włodarczyk. With a reducing readership and falling revenues, the final edition of the weekly appeared between March and April 1981. The book prize continued until 1990.

Archive
The Wiadomości archive, having been safeguarded initially by the Lanckoroński Foundation in London's Kensington, was finally deposited for permanent safe-keeping with the main Emigration Archive housed in the University of Torun Library. In the interim, The Emigration Archive was able to secure a number of lost letters to and from the Editor of Wiadomości which turned up in various auction houses.

References

External links
 The Emigration Archive
 „Wiadomości” – digitised editions in the Kujawsko-Pomorska Biblioteka Cyfrowa, Kujawy-Pomorze Digital Library

1946 establishments in the United Kingdom
1981 disestablishments in the United Kingdom
Cold War
Defunct literary magazines published in Poland
Defunct literary magazines published in the United Kingdom
Defunct political magazines published in the United Kingdom
Magazines disestablished in 1981
Magazines established in 1946
Magazines published in London
Poetry literary magazines
Polish-language magazines
Political magazines published in Poland
Weekly magazines published in Poland